Valero is a surname and a masculine given name. People with the name are as follows:

Surname
 Aaron Valero (1913–2000), Israeli physician and educator
 Addy Valero (died 2020), Venezuelan politician
 Antonio Valero, multiple people
 Antonio Valero de Bernabe (1790–1863), Puerto Rican military leader
 Art Valero (born 1958), American football coach
 Bodil Valero (born 1958), Swedish politician
 Borja Valero (born 1985), Spanish football player
 Carlos Gimeno Valero (born 2001), Spanish tennis player
 Carmen Valero (born 1955), Spanish athlete
 Cristina Torrens Valero (born 1974), Spanish tennis player
 Cristóbal Valero (1707–1789), Spanish painter and presbyter
 Damien Valero (born 1965), French artist and academic
 David Valero (born 1988), Spanish cyclist
 Dora Martínez Valero (born 1976), Mexican politician
 Edwin Valero (1981–2010), Venezuelan professional boxer
 Elisa Valero (born 1971), Spanish architect and academic
 Elisabet Escursell Valero (born 1996), Spanish cyclist
 Haim Aharon Valero (1846–1923), banker and first non-rabbi to lead the Sephardi Kollel in Jerusalem
 Francisco Valero (1906–1982), Mexican fencer
 Jacob Valero (1813–1874), Jewish banker
 Jorge Valero (born 1946), Venezuelan historian and ambassador
 José Sótero Valero Ruz (1936–2012), Venezuelan Catholic bishop
 Julien Valéro (born 1984), French football player
 Julieta Valero (born 1971), Spanish poet
 Maria Valero (born 1991), Venezuelan volleyball player
 Mateo Valero (born 1952), Spanish computer architect
 Óscar Valero (born 1985), Spanish football player
 Roberto Valero (1955–1994), Cuban poet and novelist
 Roque Valero (born 1974), Venezuelan singer, actor and politician
 Rosemary Valero-O'Connell (born 1994), American illustrator and cartoonist
 Thierry Valéro, French rugby player
 Xavi Valero (born 1973), Spanish football goalkeeper
 Ximena Valero (born 1977), Mexican fashion designer

Given name
 Valerius of Saragossa (d. 315 AD), bishop and Catholic saint
 Valero Iriarte (c. 1680–c. 1753), Spanish Baroque painter
 Valero Rivera Folch (born 1985), Spanish handball player
 Valero Rivera López (born 1953), Spanish handball player
 Valero Serer (1932–2022), Spanish football player

See also
 Valero

Spanish masculine given names
Spanish-language surnames
Surnames of Italian origin